Armoracia is a genus of flowering plants of the family Brassicaceae, native to the Palaearctic. Its best known member is horseradish, Armoracia rusticana, which is the type species.

Species
Many species have been described, but most have ended up synonymized. Species still considered valid by The Plant List are as follows: 
Armoracia macrocarpa (Waldst. & Kit.) Kit. ex Baumg.
Armoracia rusticana P.Gaertn., B.Mey. & Scherb.
Armoracia sisymbrioides (DC.) N.Busch ex Ganesh

References

 
Brassicaceae genera